In mathematics, a sheaf of planes is the set of all planes that have the same common line. It may also be known as a fan of planes or a pencil of planes.

When extending the concept of line to the line at infinity, a set of parallel planes can be seen as a sheaf of planes intersecting in a line at infinity. To distinguish it from the more general definition, the adjective parallel can be added to it, resulting in the expression parallel sheaf of planes.

See also
Book embedding, a notion of graph embedding onto sheafs of half-planes

Notes

Mathematical concepts
Planes (geometry)